Indoor(s) may refer to:

the interior of a building
Indoor environment, in building science, traditionally includes the study of indoor thermal environment, indoor acoustic environment, indoor light environment, and indoor air quality
Built environment, the human-made environment that provides the setting for human activity
Indoor athletics
indoor games and sports

See also
 
 
 Indore (disambiguation)
 Inside (disambiguation)
 The Great Indoors (disambiguation)